Holger Apfel (born 29 December 1970) is a German politician who was the leader of the far-right National Democratic Party of Germany (NPD) from 2011 to 2013. He was a member of the Saxon Parliament between 2004 and 2014, serving as the chairman of the NPD parliamentary group and a member of the presidium of the parliament.

Apfel became the NPD's national leader in 2011. On 19 December 2013, he resigned with immediate effect from his leadership positions at both the national and the state level, before leaving the party entirely five days later. He resigned from the Saxon Parliament on 17 January 2014. He was parodied as the leader of the NDP in the 2015 film Look Who's Back as the character "Ulf Birne".

Political activities
Apfel has a long history of activism with the NPD, starting in the 1980s when he was active in the NPD's youth organisation. He was the deputy chairman of the NPD at the national level between 2000 and 2009 and deputy chairman at the state level between 2002 and 2009. Between 2009 and 2011, he served as the chairman of Saxony's NPD.

State politics
On 19 September 2004, Apfel led the NPD in Saxony to its biggest electoral success, winning 9.2% of the popular vote and twelve seats in the Landtag. He became the leader of the party's parliamentary group.

In 2005, Apfel and his party refused to take part in a moment of silence for the victims of Nazi Germany, which was to be held in the Saxon Landtag. The NPD parliamentary group had previously demanded that a moment of silence be held for the victims of the bombing of Dresden instead. In the ensuing parliamentary debate Apfel called the Allies of World War II "mass murderers" and accused the British of having waged a "holocaust" against Germans.

National politics
In the 2005 federal election, he was a candidate for the constituency of Kamenz, Hoyerswerda and Großenhain, and received 6.7% of the votes.

On 13 November 2011, he was elected leader of the NPD at the national level.

Resignation
On 19 December 2013, he resigned with immediate effect from his leadership positions at both the national and the state level. Media outlets initially reported that Apfel was in poor health and suffering from "burnout syndrome".

Three days after the announcement, the party presidium held an emergency meeting to discuss rumours about Apfel's private life. It subsequently issued a statement asserting that Apfel "has not yet refuted ongoing allegations concerning past transgressions". Amid the threat of an expulsion proceeding, Apfel resigned from the party entirely on 24 December.

Apfel resigned from his seat in the Saxon Parliament on 17 January 2014.

Personal life
Apfel was married to Jasmin Apfel (born 1983), formerly the head of the NPD women's organisation, Ring Nationaler Frauen. They have three children. In 2012, the couple separated and Jasmin Apfel announced that she had resigned from both the RNF and the NPD. However, Apfel announced later that year that the couple were once again together. In March 2017 it was reported that Jasmin Apfel and her husband had separated, and that she had renounced right-wing extremism. 

It was reported in May 2014 that Apfel and his wife had begun operating a local restaurant on the island of Majorca.

References

1970 births
Living people
Members of the Landtag of Saxony
National Democratic Party of Germany politicians
People from Hildesheim
German emigrants to Spain